Norman Lash (1914 – 2002) was a New Zealand international lawn bowler.

Bowls career
He competed in the first World Bowls Championship in Kyeemagh, New South Wales, Australia in 1966  and won a gold medal in the fours with Ron Buchan, Gordon Jolly and Bill O'Neill at the event.

He won the 1965 & 1977 pairs title and 1963 fours title at the New Zealand National Bowls Championships when bowling for the Carlton and Hutt Bowls Clubs.

References

1914 births
Date of death unknown
New Zealand male bowls players
Bowls World Champions
20th-century New Zealand people
21st-century New Zealand people